Get Born is the debut studio album by Australian rock band Jet. It was released on 14 September 2003 and has sold over 4 million copies worldwide. The album includes Jet's most popular song, "Are You Gonna Be My Girl".

Writing and recording
Jet entered the Sunset Sound Studios in Los Angeles with Dave Sardy to produce their debut album Get Born. Sardy had previously produced records for Marilyn Manson and The Dandy Warhols. The band left the recording studios halfway through recording the album to fly back to support the Rolling Stones on their 2003 Australian tour.

"Are You Gonna Be My Girl", from this album, was voted number one in the 2003 Triple J Hottest 100. Get Born also has a song, "Timothy", dedicated to guitarist Cameron Muncey's brother, who died when he was a baby (the song has also been remixed for American rapper Timbaland's 2009 album Shock Value II). The track "Radio Song" was written about when they were an unsigned band in Melbourne seeking attention, and "Rollover DJ" was written about the difficulty they encountered when trying to play gigs because of the takeover of dance music.

The album's name was derived from a lyric to the Bob Dylan song "Subterranean Homesick Blues".

Critical reception

Get Born received generally positive reviews from contemporary music critics. At Metacritic, which assigns a normalised rating out of 100 to reviews from mainstream critics, the album received an average score of 70, based on 15 reviews. Alternative Press gave it a rave review and found Jet's songs "catchy" and their appeal "diverse". Q magazine said that the album's raw immediacy "belies its dated influences." Uncut called it "an efficient if fairly joyless hybrid of the Stones, AC/DC and Oasis." In a negative review, Pitchfork wrote that Jet sounds like "everyone's favorite old rock bands" and have "insipid lyrics", including interjections such as "come on!" and "oh yeah!" sung "every five seconds". Robert Christgau of The Village Voice cited "Rollover D.J." and "Look What You've Done" as highlights and remarked that the band has "the juice and talent to make their retro happen without the brains or vision to run with it". He gave the album a two-star honorable mention, indicating a "likable effort consumers attuned to its overriding aesthetic or individual vision may well enjoy." In October 2010, Get Born was listed in the book 100 Best Australian Albums.

Lead single
The album's lead single, "Are You Gonna Be My Girl", was often singled out due to distinct similarities to Iggy Pop's "Lust for Life". The song featured a near-identical guitar riff, as well as a drum pattern markedly similar to that of Pop's well-known song. The band argued that "Are You Gonna Be My Girl" had more in common with '60s Motown, however; namely, songs such as "I'm Ready for Love" by Martha And The Vandellas and "You Can't Hurry Love" by The Supremes. In an AllMusic review of "Are You Gonna Be My Girl", the song was praised for its commercial appeal despite its resemblance to "Lust for Life", saying "Whether 'Are You Gonna Be My Girl?' (sic) is creatively bankrupt, or just an extreme example of how all music is influenced by what came before it, is up for debate... Either way, the song is impossible to ignore."

Chris Cester addressed the media speculation in an interview with Uptown Magazine, stating: "It's funny because I asked him point blank about that. He said I was crazy. He said that when he and David Bowie were writing 'Lust for Life', they were ripping off Motown's beat. It's funny that he said that to me because we also thought we were ripping off Motown more than 'Lust for Life'. To be honest with you that kind of annoyed me a lot, because I always thought it was really lazy. People just go well 'Lust for Life' is more well-known so that's what they go for, but if you listen to a song like 'You Can't Hurry Love' (The Supremes) I think you'll find it's closer to 'Are You Gonna Be My Girl' than 'Lust for Life' ever was. And that's what Iggy said as well."

Commercial performance
Get Born debuted at number three and peaked at number one on the Australian ARIA Albums Chart as of May 2004 (so far being certified 8× Platinum), number 17 on the UK Albums Chart (number 14 after a re-entry in June 2004), and peaked at number 26 on the U.S. Billboard 200 albums chart (and was certified Platinum).

"Are You Gonna Be My Girl?" also peaked at number 20 and certified Gold on the Australian ARIA Singles Chart, number 23 on the UK Singles Chart in September 2003 (number 16 after a re-release in May 2004), and number 29 on the U.S. Billboard Hot 100 singles chart.

The second single, "Rollover DJ", was released in Australia and the UK, and peaked at number 31 and number 34 respectively.

The third single released in Australia and the UK was "Look What You've Done", which peaked at number 14 and number 28 respectively. It was also released as the third single in the U.S. in January 2005, and reached number 37 as of March 2005.

In the US, "Cold Hard Bitch" was released as the second single, reaching number one on the Billboard Modern Rock and Mainstream Rock charts and number 55 on the Billboard Hot 100. In Australia, it was released as the fourth single in July 2004, and reached number 33 in August 2004, and in the UK, it reached number 34 in September 2004.

A fifth single also charted in the UK, this being "Get Me Outta Here", reaching number 37 in December 2004.

In the week ending 11 September 2006, Get Born re-entered at a position of number 46 on the ARIA Charts, presumably because Jet had "Put Your Money Where Your Mouth Is", the lead single from their second album, Shine On.

Track listing

Personnel
Jet
Nic Cester – lead vocals, guitars
Chris Cester – drums, percussion, tambourine, backing vocals, lead vocals 
Cameron Muncey – guitars, backing vocals, lead vocals 
Mark Wilson – bass guitar, piano , harmonica 

Additional musicians
 Billy Preston – keyboards
 Roger Joseph Manning Jr. – keyboards
 Andre Warhurst – slide guitar 
 Dave Sardy – producer, tambourine, slide guitar , additional guitar 
 Davey Lane – additional guitar

Charts

Weekly charts

Year-end charts

Decade-end charts

Certifications

Notes

References

2003 debut albums
Albums produced by Dave Sardy
ARIA Award-winning albums
Capitol Records albums
Elektra Records albums
Jet (band) albums